Antoine Emile "Toine" Hezemans (born 15 April 1943, in Eindhoven) is a Dutch former touring and prototype racing car driver in 1960s and 1970s. After retiring from racing, Hezemans spent some time as a manager of Phoenix Carsport team. One of the drivers was his son, Mike Hezemans. 

Hezemans won the European Touring Car Championship in 1970 with Alfa Romeo GTAm and in 1973 with BMW 3.0 CSL and 1975 Euro GT class with Porsche 934.
In the 1970s Hezemans drove also Alfa Romeo Tipo 33 prototype racers, winning the 1971 Targa Florio with Nino Vaccarella in an Alfa Romeo 33/3.

He has three sons, Mike Hezemans, Loris Hezemans and Liam Hezemans.

Wins 
 Winner of the European Touring Car Championship 1970 and 1973
 Winner of the Targa Florio 1971
 Winner of the Spa 24 Hours 1973
 Winner of the 24 Hours of Le Mans in the TS category 1973 and GTS category in 1975
 Winner of the European GT Championship 1976
 Winner of the 24 Hours of Daytona 1978
 Winner of the 6 Hours of Watkins Glen 1978

Le Mans results

References 

1943 births
Living people
Sportspeople from Eindhoven
Dutch racing drivers
24 Hours of Le Mans drivers
24 Hours of Daytona drivers
24 Hours of Spa drivers
World Sportscar Championship drivers
European Touring Car Championship drivers

BMW M drivers